Frank Scanlan (17 April 1926 – 21 December 2009) was an Australian rules footballer who played with Melbourne and Footscray in the Victorian Football League (VFL).

Family
The son of Francis Scanlan (1885–1961) and Minnie Scanlan, nee Coghlan (1892–1976), Frank Scanlan was born in Sandringham, Victoria on 17 April 1926. He was the younger brother of fellow Melbourne and Footscray VFL player Bill Scanlan.

Football

Melbourne
Scanlan made his Melbourne debut shortly after his 16th birthday, making him one of Melbourne's youngest ever senior players. He served in the Royal Australian Navy in World War II, missing the 1945 and 1946 seasons as a result.

Footscray
In 1949, Scanlan moved to Footscray along with his brother Bill Scanlan.

Port Fairy
After a year with Footscray, Scanlan was appointed as playing coach of Port Fairy where he both coached and played for two seasons.

Sandringham (VFA)
In 1952 Scanlan commenced pre-season training with Footscray but after failing to make the senior list he moved to Sandringham where he played for the 1952 VFA season.

Tocumwal
In 1953, Scanlan was appointed playing coach of Tocumwal in the Riverina district of New South Wales. He won the Murray Football League best and fairest award that year but Tocumwal narrowly lost the Grand Final to Numurkah.

Death
Francis Scanlan died on 21 December 2009 and was cremated at Springvale Botanical Cemetery.

External links 

Frank Scanlan's playing statistics from The VFA Project
Frank Scanlan's profile at Demonwiki

Notes 

1926 births
2009 deaths
Australian rules footballers from Melbourne
Melbourne Football Club players
Western Bulldogs players
Sandringham Football Club players
Port Fairy Football Club players
People from Sandringham, Victoria
Burials in Victoria (Australia)
Royal Australian Navy personnel of World War II
Military personnel from Melbourne